The Northeastern Huskies represented Northeastern University in the Women's Hockey East Association during the 2020–21 NCAA Division I women's ice hockey season. In addition to capturing the regular season title, the Huskies defeated the Providence Friars by a 6–2 mark to win the Hockey East postseason tournament.

Qualifying for the 2021 NCAA National Collegiate Women's Ice Hockey Tournament, the program ranked as the #1 seed. The Huskies lost to Wisconsin 1–2 in overtime in the national championship game.

On February 9, 2021, it was announced that the Northeastern men's and women's hockey programs will represent the United States of America at the FISU World University Games in Lucerne, Switzerland, from Dec. 11–21, 2021.

Offseason

Recruiting

Regular season

Standings

Schedule

Source:
|-
!colspan=12 style="  "| Regular Season
|-

|-
!colspan=12 style="  "| Hockey East Tournament
|-

|-
!colspan=12 style="  "| NCAA Tournament
|-

Roster

2020–21 Huskies

Awards and honors
Skylar Fontaine, Hockey East Defensive Player of the Week (awarded March 8, 2021)
Skylar Fontaine, Northeastern, 2021 Hockey East Best Defenseman Award
Aerin Frankel, 2021 Patty Kazmaier Award
Aerin Frankel, ARMY ROTC Hockey East Player of the Week (awarded March 8, 2021)
Aerin Frankel and Alina Mueller, Co-Recipients, 2020-21 Hockey East Player of the Year
Aerin Frankel, Hockey East Goaltending Champion
Aerin Frankel, Northeastern, 2021 Hockey East PNC Bank Three Stars Award
Molly Griffin, Pro Ambitions Hockey East Rookie of the Week (awarded March 8, 2021)
Alina Mueller, Hockey East Scoring Champion (31 points)

All-America honors
Aerin Frankel, 2020-21 CCM/AHCA First Team All-American

Skylar Fontaine, 2020-21 CCM/AHCA First Team All-American

Alina Mueller, 2020-21 CCM/AHCA First Team All-American

Chloe Aurard, 2020-21 Second Team CCM/AHCA All-American

HCA Awards
Aerin Frankel, Hockey Commissioners Association Women’s National Goaltender of the Month, January 2021
Aerin Frankel, Hockey Commissioners Association Women’s National Goaltender of the Month, February 2021 
Aerin Frankel, SR Goalie, Northeastern, Hockey Commissioners Association Women’s Goaltender of the Month (March 2021) 
Aerin Frankel, Hockey Commissioners Association Women's Goalie of the Year 2021
Alina Mueller, Hockey Commissioners Association Women’s Player of the Month (February 2021)

References

Northeastern Huskies women's ice hockey seasons
Northeastern
Northeastern
Northeastern
Northeastern
NCAA women's ice hockey Frozen Four seasons